Faye Hudson can refer to:
Faye Hudson (Neighbours) (active 1991–1992), character of Australian soap opera Neighbours
Faye Blackstone (born Hudson, 1915–2011), American rodeo star